Glow On (stylized in all caps) is the third studio album by the American hardcore punk band Turnstile, released on August 27, 2021, via Roadrunner Records. It is the band's last album to feature founding guitarist Brady Ebert, who departed from the band in August 2022.

The album was recorded in summer 2020 at Phantom Studios in Gallatin, Tennessee. It was recorded by American producer Mike Elizondo, and marks as the band's first release to include a featured artist with a guest appearance from British singer/songwriter and producer Blood Orange.

Glow On was preceded by the band's fifth EP, Turnstile Love Connection, released June 27, 2021, which previewed four songs (including lead single, "Mystery") from the album set to an accompanying short film directed by frontman and lead vocalist, Yates. The follow-up singles, "Alien Love Call" featuring Blood Orange, "Blackout" and "Fly Again" were released July and August 2021 respectively.

Glow On sold 15,600 album-equivalent units in its first week to debut at number 30 on the US Billboard 200, becoming the band's first album to chart there, and received universal acclaim from music critics, and was named the best album of 2021 by Spin and the Pittsburgh Post-Gazette.

Composition
Glow On has been praised for making hardcore "genre-fluid" and showing "just how innovative [the genre] could become". It and the quintet have been seen for expanding 1990s melodic hardcore. To balance out the hardcore sounds, they also dig into "melodic" alt-rock songs. Alternative pop, grunge, indie rock, post-punk, psychedelia, rap rock, R&B, shoegazing and soul sounds also appear throughout. Chris Richards of The Washington Post noted that the album's sound could be compared to that of Jane's Addiction.

Glow On is also noted for its "cleanly-produced" takes on pop music. A "newly-polished" dream pop style shows as well, yielding a sound for the album that is cast in "overt hues of pink".

"Don't Play" mixes samba into punk rock while "No Surprise" is "hazy" emo pop. With its drums, cowbells and layered handclaps, "Dance-Off" journeys into "heavy" funk.

Critical reception

Glow On received universal acclaim from music critics. On Metacritic, it holds a score of 92 out of 100, indicating "universal acclaim", based on thirteen reviews.

Laviea Thomas for Clash called it "a riveting return" for the quintet. Australian Guitar Magazine called the album "a true masterclass in the art of heavy music", with writer Matt Doria adding, "the sheer depth and dynamism of its musicality cannot be understated, nor Turnstile’s passion in sculpting it." Paste beamed over its universal appeal, writing, "GLOW ON isn’t just one of the best hardcore albums of the year; it’s one of the best albums of the year in general." Reviewing the album for AllMusic, James Christopher Monger described it as both "vital and respective" and claimed it to be "a violent, late-summer storm" that "pummels the power grid but mercifully leaves the lights on."

Accolades

Year-end lists

A "—" denotes the publication's list is in no particular order, and Glow On did not rank numerically.

Track listing

Notes
 All tracks are stylized in all caps. For example, "Mystery" is stylized as "MYSTERY".

Personnel
Credits adapted from the liner notes of Glow On and Tidal.

Turnstile
 Brendan Yates – vocals (tracks 1–13, 15), co-production (all tracks), art direction
 Franz Lyons – bass (all tracks), vocals (tracks 6, 14)
 Brady Ebert – guitar (all tracks)
 Pat McCrory – guitar (all tracks)
 Daniel Fang – drums (tracks 1–13, 15)

Additional personnel
 Dev Hynes – vocals (tracks 9, 15), additional vocals (track 7)
 Julien Baker – additional vocals (track 4)
 Mike Elizondo – production (all tracks), drum programming (1–7, 10–13) synthesizer (tracks 1, 9–15)
 Adam Hawkins – mixing (all tracks)
 Lawson White – engineering (all tracks)
 Erica Block – assistant engineering (all tracks)
 Zachary Stokes – assistant engineering (all tracks)
 Chris Gehringer – mastering
 Alexis Jamet – cover, design
 Dewey Saunders – art direction
 Jimmy Fontaine – band photos

Charts

References

External links
 

2021 albums
Turnstile (band) albums
Roadrunner Records albums
Albums produced by Mike Elizondo